Linepithema micans is a small species of ant from the genus Linepithema which was described by Forel in 1908. This ant is endemic to southern South America. In Brazil, it is considered a pest of vineyards in acting as the main species associated with the coccid Eurhizococcus brasiliensis (Wille, 1922) (Hemiptera: Margarodidae). It is still a poorly studied species. Their abundant larvae are round and whitish, almost indistinguishable from the proximate species Linepithema humile, better known as the invasive Argentine ant.

References

Dolichoderinae
Hymenoptera of South America
Insects described in 1908